This is a complete list of World Aquatics Championships medalists in high diving.

Men
Bold numbers in brackets denotes record number of victories.

Medals:

Women
Bold numbers in brackets denotes record number of victories.

Medals:

Overall medal table

References

High diving at the World Aquatics Championships
high diving
Lists of acrobatic divers